The 1970 NAIA Soccer Championship was the 12th annual tournament held by the NAIA to determine the national champion of men's college soccer among its members in the United States.

Davis & Elkins defeated Quincy (IL) in the final, 2–0, to claim the Senators' second NAIA national title. This was a rematch of the 1968 final, also won by Davis & Elkins.

The final was  played at Dunn, North Carolina.

Qualification

For the third year, the tournament field remained fixed at eight teams.

Bracket

See also  
 1970 NCAA Soccer Championship

References 

NAIA championships
NAIA
1970 in sports in North Carolina